John James Gregory (16 February 1905 – 9 October 1992) was an Australian rules footballer who played with North Melbourne in the Victorian Football League (VFL).

Gregory, who played his football as a half-back flanker, was a North Melbourne junior. He had his best season in 1931 when he polled 10 Brownlow Medal votes and the following year represented the VFL.

He was the first ever North Melbourne footballer to play 150 games for the club. During that time he appeared in only 24 wins.

References

External links
 

1905 births
1992 deaths
Australian rules footballers from Victoria (Australia)
North Melbourne Football Club players